The , officially the , is a Japanese funicular line in Yawata, Kyoto, operated by Keihan Electric Railway. The line opened in 1926 as a route to Iwashimizu Shrine. Riders in January, the season of hatsumōde (New Year's Day visit to shrine), account for 50% of the whole year ridership.

Basic data
Distance: 
System: Single track with two cars
Gauge: 
Stations: 2
Vertical interval:

Stations

See also
List of funicular railways
List of railway lines in Japan

References

External links 
  

Funicular railways in Japan
Rail transport in Kyoto Prefecture
1067 mm gauge railways in Japan
Railway lines opened in 1926
1926 establishments in Japan